The Old Cliftonian Society (OCS) is the Society for the alumni of Clifton College (both pupils and staff) and organises regular reunions at the school and publishes a regular newsletter for alumni.

The Society publishes an annual magazine for alumni called "The Cliftonian".

Clifton College Register

The register's motto:

"There be of them, that have left a name behind them, that their praises might be reported..."

The Clifton College Register is the definitive set of records held for Clifton College in Bristol. The Register is kept and maintained by the Old Cliftonian Society.

The record has been maintained unbroken from the start of the school in 1862 and lists every pupil, master and headmaster. Each person is allocated a unique and consecutive school number - and for masters and headmasters the number is prefixed with either an M or HM as appropriate. The Register also maintains a record of the school roll in numbers, the Heads of School and summarises the major sporting records for each year.

The Register is periodically published by the Old Cliftonian Society; at present there are three available volumes:

1862 - 1947
1948 - 1977
1978 - 1994

A new edition is currently being prepared (2010).

List of Headmasters from the register
Allocated consecutive numbers, prefixed HM

HM1  - John Percival - Lord Bishop of Hereford
HM2  - Canon James Wilson (1879–1890)
HM3  - Canon Michael George Glazebrook
HM4  - Rev. Albert Augustus David
HM5  - Dr John David King
HM6  - Norman Whatley
HM7  - Bertrand Leslie Hallward
HM8  - Henry Desmond Pritchard Lee
HM9  - Nicholas Geoffrey Lempriere Hammond
HM10 - Steve John McWatters
HM11 - Stuart Morrison Andrew
HM12 - Andrew Hugh Monro
HM13 - Dr Stephen Spurr
HM14 - Mark Moore
HM15 - Dr Tim Greene

Old Cliftonians
See List of Old Cliftonians

First entries in the Register
Pupils
Allocated consecutive numbers, prefixed P

 P1. Sept 1862 - Francis Charles Anderson (b 14 Nov 1846 - d 1881)

Masters
Allocated consecutive numbers, prefixed M

 M1. Sept 1862 - Rev. Dr. Thomas Henry Stokoe. (Educated at Uppingham; Exhibition at Lincoln College Oxford. Left - 1863. d 1903)

Headmasters
Allocated consecutive numbers, prefixed HM

 HM1 - John Percival - Lord Bishop of Hereford

The early years
Numbers of pupils in the school

1862  - 69
1863  - 195 (including the new junior school)
1864  - 237
1865  - 258
1866  - 278

Heads of School

1862  - HW Wellesley
1863  - AW Paul

References

Sources
The Clifton College Register - various editions.

External links
Old Cliftonian Website
Clifton College Website

Private schools in Bristol
Alumni associations of academic institutions
Organisations based in Bristol